Hot R&B/Hip-Hop Songs is a chart published by Billboard that ranks the top-performing songs in the United States in African-American-oriented musical genres; the chart has undergone various name changes since its launch in 1942 to reflect the evolution of such genres.  In 1974, it was published under the title Hot Soul Singles.  During that year, 30 different singles topped the chart, based on playlists submitted by radio stations and surveys of retail sales outlets.

Stevie Wonder had both the first and last number ones of 1974.  In the issue of Billboard dated January 5, Wonder spent his second week at number one with "Living for the City".  He returned to the top spot in September with "You Haven't Done Nothin'", and gained his third chart-topper of the year when "Boogie On Reggae Woman" reached the peak position in the issue dated December 28, making it the year's final number one.  Wonder was one of three acts to take three different singles to number one during 1974, along with James Brown and Gladys Knight & the Pips.  The latter two acts each spent a cumulative total of five weeks at number one, placing them in a three-way tie with Roberta Flack for 1974's highest number of weeks atop the chart.  Flack's "Feel Like Makin' Love" topped the chart for five consecutive weeks, the year's longest unbroken run at number one, and was ranked by Billboard as the year's best-performing soul single.

Two of 1974's Hot Soul Singles number ones showcased the emerging disco genre, which would go on to dominate American popular music in the latter half of the 1970s.  In April, MFSB, the house band at the recording studio operated by producers Kenny Gamble and Leon Huff, topped the chart with "TSOP (The Sound of Philadelphia)", the theme tune from the TV show Soul Train; the song also featured vocals by the girl group the Three Degrees, who had previously entered the top ten twice in their own right.  Three months later, George McCrae reached number one with another disco song, "Rock Your Baby"; both singles also topped the all-genre Hot 100 chart.  "Can't Get Enough of Your Love, Babe" by Barry White and Stevie Wonder's "You Haven't Done Nothin'" also topped both charts.  MFSB, the Three Degrees and McCrae all gained the first number ones of their respective careers in 1974, as did a large number of other acts.  William DeVaughn, Kool & the Gang, Blue Magic, B. T. Express, Latimore, Shirley Brown, Rufus featuring Chaka Khan, and Tavares all made their first appearances at the top of the chart during the year.

Chart history

See also
List of Billboard Hot 100 number-one singles of 1974

References

1974
1974 record charts
1974 in American music